P38 or P-38 may refer to:

Biology and medicine
 Multisynthetase complex auxiliary component p38
 p38 mitogen-activated protein kinases
 RPP38, ribonuclease P protein subunit p38

Military
 , a P-class sloop of the Royal Navy
 , a submarine of the Royal Navy
 Lockheed P-38 Lightning, an American fighter aircraft
 P-38 can opener, issued by the United States Armed Forces
 Walther P38, a pistol

Other uses
 Mitchell Wing P-38, an American ultralight aircraft
 Papyrus 38, a biblical manuscript
 Phosphorus-38, an isotope of phosphorus
 Range Rover (P38A), a SUV
 Porax-38, a starfighter from the Star Wars fictional universe